Naval Air Squadron (in Polish: Morski Dywizjon Lotniczy) was a unit of the Polish Air Force between the two World Wars. The unit was formed in 1920 in Puck. In 1939, it was composed of the Long Range Reconnaissance Escadrille (I Eskadra Dalekiego Rozpoznania) and the Short Range Reconnaissance Escadrille (II Eskadra Bliskiego Rozpoznania)

Puck air base was bombed by Nazi Germany at 5.20am Polish time on Friday September 1. Luftwaffe bombers dropped a projectile on the town, which also had an airbase for the Naval Air Squadron; dealing significant damage to the Polish air force units stationed there.

References

Military units and formations of the Polish Air Force